Amerila kuehni is a moth of the subfamily Arctiinae. It was described by Walter Rothschild in 1910. It is found on Damar Island in Indonesia.

References

 , 1910: Catalogue of the Arctianae in the Tring museum, with notes and descriptions of new species. Novitates Zoologicae 17 (1): 1–85, (2): 113–188, pl. XI–XIV, 18: pl. III–VI, London and Aylesbury.

Moths described in 1910
Amerilini
Moths of Indonesia